Anthony Loza Reyes (born October 16, 1981) is an American former professional baseball pitcher who played five seasons in Major League Baseball (MLB). He pitched primarily as a starting pitcher for the St. Louis Cardinals and Cleveland Indians. Reyes attended the University of Southern California (USC), before the Cardinals selected him in the 15th round of the 2003 MLB draft, and made his major league debut on August 9, 2005.

A native of Whittier, California, Reyes became the Cardinals' top prospect in their minor league system.  As a rookie, he was a member of the Cardinals' 2006 World Series championship team, including starting Game 1.  Following his playing career, he became a firefighter for the Los Angeles County Fire Department.

High school
Reyes attended California High School in Whittier, California. He was once considered too small to be a pitcher, but proved the coaches wrong and played varsity and went on to USC. He goes back to California High during the off season to practice and stays in touch with the coaches.

College career
Reyes spent his college years at the University of Southern California from 2000 to 2003, and though he was selected by the Detroit Tigers in the 13th round of the  amateur draft, he elected to return to school for his senior year. He was on several USC teams with San Diego Padres pitcher Mark Prior. In four seasons with the Trojans, Reyes compiled a 17–16 record and earned Pac-10 honors three times.

Professional career
Reyes was eventually considered the top pitching prospect in the St. Louis farm system. He spent the  season initially with the Palm Beach Cardinals, where he compiled a 3-0 record with a 4.66 ERA, and then later with the Tennessee Smokies, where he achieved a 6-2 record with a 2.91 ERA.

After a solid  season with the Triple-A Memphis Redbirds, Reyes was given a chance to prove himself in the major leagues. On August 9, at Miller Park, Reyes threw 6 innings in his debut start against the Milwaukee Brewers, earning the win and giving up just two runs on two hits. He was demoted immediately after the game, having fulfilled his role of giving the regular rotation an extra day's rest by manager Tony La Russa.

Reyes opened the  season with Memphis. He was recalled to St. Louis June 23 when Mark Mulder was placed on the disabled list. As a result, Reyes was asked to start the final game of a three-game series against the Chicago White Sox. In the previous two games, the White Sox scored 33 runs against the Cardinals. In the third game Reyes threw 90 pitches, 67 for strikes, had six strikeouts and no walks, and carried a no-hitter into the seventh inning. The only White Sox hit was a home run by Jim Thome. The Cardinals offense could not respond in kind and the White Sox won, 1–0. Reyes pitched an eight inning complete game and took the loss despite giving up only the one hit (albeit a home run) to Thome.

During the Cardinals' 2006 playoff run, Reyes was left off the roster for the National League Division Series against the San Diego Padres. However, after advancing to the National League Championship Series against the New York Mets, the Cardinals added him to the roster in place of starting pitcher Jason Marquis. Reyes started Game 4 of the series and pitched four innings, taking a no-decision. He started the first game of the 2006 World Series against fellow rookie Justin Verlander and earned the win, pitching eight innings and retiring 17 consecutive batters from the first through the sixth inning; a World Series record for a rookie. Reyes gave up two runs and earned player of the game honors. The Cardinals went on to win the series, defeating the Detroit Tigers four games to one.

After starting the  season 0–8 with a 6.08 ERA (although he had the worst run support in the majors), the Cardinals optioned him to Memphis on May 27. Todd Wellemeyer replaced him in the Cardinals starting rotation. He made three strong starts for the Redbirds and was recalled to St. Louis June 16, but was optioned back to Memphis again on July 2. Reyes was called up again from Memphis to make a spot start in a doubleheader against Milwaukee. He pitched well allowing 2 runs on two hits.

Reyes began the  season in St. Louis's bullpen, going 2–1 with a 4.91 ERA before being demoted to Triple-A Memphis. He went 2–3 with a 3.25 ERA in 11 starts at Memphis.

On July 26, 2008, Reyes was traded to the Cleveland Indians for right-handed reliever Luis Perdomo and cash.

On August 8, 2008, the Indians promoted Reyes from Triple-A Buffalo. That same day, he made his first start for Cleveland, going 6 innings, allowing just 1 run, and picked up the win.

Reyes was non-tendered by the Indians on December 12, 2009, making him a free agent. He was re-signed to a minor league contract on December 13. During spring training his contract was purchased by the Indians, at which time he was placed on the 60-day disabled list, while recovering from Tommy John surgery. After spending the entire 2010 season on the disabled list, Reyes was outrighted to the Triple-A Columbus Clippers on October 29, 2010. After electing free agency, Reyes signed a one-year minor league contract with the Indians on November 15. His contract includes a non-roster invitation to the Indians' 2011 spring training camp.

Reyes spent the 2011 season rehabbing his injured elbow, never appearing on the 40-man roster. He was released by the Indians on August 5, 2011, and retired after a season in the San Diego Padres organization.

Personal life

Reyes became a Los Angeles County firefighter in March 2017, and was pressed into action to combat the wildfires in California later that year.

See also

 List of people from Whittier, California

References

External links

1981 births
Living people
St. Louis Cardinals players
Cleveland Indians players
American baseball players of Mexican descent
Baseball players from California
Major League Baseball pitchers
Sportspeople from Whittier, California
USC Trojans baseball players
Palm Beach Cardinals players
Tennessee Smokies players
Memphis Redbirds players
Buffalo Bisons (minor league) players
Arizona League Indians players
Akron Aeros players
Tucson Padres players
American firefighters